Vasilios Xenopoulos (born 20 May 1998) is a Greek professional footballer who plays as a goalkeeper for Super League club Panathinaikos.

Career

Panathinaikos
Xenopoulos plays as a goalkeeper and joined Panathinaikos from the team's youth ranks. He appeared in 3 games throughout the 2019–20 season, keeping one clean sheet.

On 12 February 2021, Xenopoulos signed a new contract, running until the summer of 2023.

Career statistics

References

1998 births
Living people
Greece under-21 international footballers
Super League Greece players
Super League Greece 2 players
Panathinaikos F.C. players
Panathinaikos F.C. B players
Association football goalkeepers
Footballers from Athens
Greek footballers